Windrushers Gliding Club (also known as Bicester Gliding Club or simply "Bicester" within gliding circles) was a gliding club flying from Bicester Airfield in Oxfordshire until late June 2020. At its heyday, the club was one of the biggest gliding clubs in the UK, hosting various competitions throughout the year and maintaining the physical presence of the British Gliding Association's shop as well as numerous BGA staff members. The club operated seven days a week, with paid staff running various elements of the club's operations.

The club also hosted Oxford University Gliding Club at their site until Windrusher's closure, where OUGC then relocated to Oxford Gliding Club. During their tenancy, the gliding Varsity match between Oxford University Gliding Club and Cambridge University Gliding Club was held at Bicester Airfield every other year, the other years it was held at Gransden Lodge Airfield. Due to the COVID-19 pandemic these competitions were not held but in the early summer of 2022 the series was restarted and held at Oxford Gliding Club. Prior to its closure, and since operations ceased the club has maintained Community amateur sports club (CASC) status, a favourable tax status.

Club history

Operational history 
Windrushers originally started at operations at Little Rissington before moving to Bicester in 1956, later merging with the Royal Air Force Gliding & Soaring Association. In July 2004  the club was reformed as a separate entity after the RAFGSA moved to RAF Halton      . The following year it hosted the UK Junior National Championship and its own Regional championship. It also later achieved the British Gliding Association's accreditation as a Junior Gliding Centre. During their operation, Windrushers hosted the following competitions;

Closure 
After discussions that took place in early 2020, the new owners of Bicester Airfield, Bicester Heritage, sought to change the lease that allowed WGC to operate on the airfield. WGC would have lost privileges they enjoyed over other users of the airfield, which would have resulted in increased cost and reduced independence to run competitions or expand operations. Bicester Heritage also looked to take over WGC property within the airfield, including the recently renovated clubrooms and workshops. In July 2020, the club left the airfield, with members leaving for various different gliding clubs in the local area such as Oxford Gliding Club, Shenington Gliding Club, Banbury Gliding Club and others further afield. The club maintains its leased was cancelled and it would have been impossible for them to stay at the airfield under the new operational requirements.

Club fleet 
When the club ceased operations, it maintained that it was not being dissolved and was instead entering a state of "hibernation", which meant they did not need to follow the CASC guidelines on disposing of assets (such as aircraft) to other eligible CASC organisations in the local area. Controversially, this now means that the majority of their fleet is unavailable for use by either their own members or those in the local area. The club has leased some of the aircraft (noted below) to some clubs however the terms of the leases are not clear as they are not in the public domain. The senior management team of the club maintains that it is searching for a new location in which to restart operations, and until it has exhausted the funds at its disposal it will not provide free access to its fleet to the public.

References

External links
Windrushers Gliding Club website
Cranfield University Gliding Club
Oxford University Gliding Club

Gliding in England
Flying clubs
Gliderports in the United Kingdom